Bahari may refer to:
Bahari, Sidhi, Tehsil in Sidhi District
Ali-Asghar Bahari (1905–1995), Iranian musician
Bahari, Bangladesh
Maziar Bahari (born 1967), Iranian-Canadian journalist, filmmaker, and playwright
Bahari (band), an American female alt pop and electronic duo